The Land of Mist is a novel  by British writer Arthur Conan Doyle, published in 1926.
 
Although this is a Professor Challenger story, it centres more on his daughter Enid and his old friend Edward Malone. Another friend from the 1912 novel The Lost World, Lord John Roxton, is also involved in the novel's second half. Professor Summerlee, who has died of old age around this time, is referred to by the mediums (much to the anger of Professor Challenger).

Plot
Reporter Ned Malone (who was one of the main characters in Arthur Conan Doyle's The Lost World) returns in this novel, in which he and Professor Challenger's daughter Enid are assigned to cover the current spiritualist phenomenon. They discover there really is something to a seance, and they try to convince Challenger to get interested in their investigations.

Spiritualism
Heavily influenced by Doyle's growing belief in Spiritualism after the death of his son, brother, and two nephews in World War I, the book focuses on Edward Malone's at first professional, and later personal interest in Spiritualism.

There is a suggestion in chapter two that the deaths of "ten million young men" in World War I was punishment by the "Central Intelligence" (that is, God) for humanity's laughing at the evidence for life after death.

See also 
 1926 in science fiction

External links

 The Land of Mist at Project Gutenberg Australia

British science fiction novels
1926 British novels
1926 science fiction novels
Professor Challenger novels
Hutchinson (publisher) books